The Ligang Bridge is a cable-stayed bridge in Taiwan. It carries Freeway 3 (Second Southern Freeway) across the Gaoping River from Dashu District, Kaohsiung in the northwest and entering Jiuru Township, Pingtung County (although it is named for nearby Ligang).

See also
 Transportation in Taiwan

References

External links
 Structurae: Ligang Bridge

Bridges in Pingtung County
Bridges in Kaohsiung
Cable-stayed bridges in Taiwan